The 2010 Scottish League Cup final was the final match of the 2009–10 Scottish League Cup, the 63rd season of the Scottish League Cup.

Route to the final

St Mirren

St Mirren faced Third Division East Stirlingshire at Ochilview Park in their first match, a comfortable 6–3 victory was secured with five goals from Billy Mehmet and one from Stephen O'Donnell. Mehmet scored one from close range, one from a chip and a third from a header to complete his hat-trick in 17 minutes. The half time score was 3–4 with Memhet scoring all of St Mirren's goals and Stephen McGuire and an Andy Rodgers brace netting for East Stirlingshire. Memhet and O'Donnell completed the scoring in the second half. St Mirren then travelled to Somerset Park to play Ayr United, Michael Higdon scored the opener after 25 minutes with a header from a David Barron cross. Dean Keenan was sent off for United in 89 minutes and Billy Memhet scored 66 seconds later to ensure the win. The further trip to Ayrshire awaited St Mirren in the third round at Rugby Park, the match ended 1-2 to the away team with goals from Stephen McGinn and a 93-minute Andy Dorman strike. The quarter-final opponents were Motherwell at St Mirren Park. The match ended 3–0 with goals from Michael Higdon, Jack Ross and a Stephen Craigan own goal. Memhet added his eighth goal of the League Cup campaign with the only goal in a 1-0 semi-final win over Hearts at Fir Park.

Rangers

As Rangers had been competing in Europe, they entered the competition in the third round. Rangers began their campaign against Dumfries team Queen of the South from the First Division, it was the first meeting between the two teams since the 2008 Scottish Cup Final. Steven Naismith opened the scoring with a tap in from a Kris Boyd cross. Substitute Nacho Novo made it 2-0 to Rangers but former Rangers youth player Robert Harris scored a consolation in 91 minutes. Dundee were beaten 3–1 at Dens Park in the quarter-final, Steven Whittaker headed Rangers in front before a Leigh Griffiths free-kick made the scores level at half time. Rangers then took the lead against the run of play with a Gary MacKenzie own-goal on 57 minutes and John Fleck rounded off the scoring with five minutes to go. St Johnstone were the next opponents, goals from Steven Davis and Lee McCulloch ensured a 2–0 victory at Hampden Park. After 26 minutes, Davis latched onto Nacho Novo's cross and lashed the ball into the net from close range at the second attempt. McCulloch doubled their advantage following fine build-up play with a low, driven shot from the edge of the box that slipped under the body of Saints goalkeeper Graeme Smith.

Match

Team news
St Mirren were without defender Chris Innes due to a torn abductor muscle. Also missing were Rory Loy, who was ineligible under the terms of his loan deal from Rangers, and Tom Brighton. Brighton was ruled out for the rest of the 2009–10 season due to a knee injury.

Rangers defender Madjid Bougherra missed his second successive League Cup final through a hamstring injury. Also missing was Kirk Broadfoot due to a hamstring strain. On 20 March Rangers manager Walter Smith stated that Neil Alexander, usually Rangers' reserve goalkeeper, was to continue in goal for the final, having played in the previous rounds. Midfielder Steven Davis was a late fitness concern with a sickness bug.

Match Summary
The Buddies dominated the first half, Steven Thomson and David Barron coming close to breaking the deadlock. Kevin Thomson was sent off for a dangerous tackle on his namesake Steven and Danny Wilson saw red for a professional foul on Craig Dargo. But Kenny Miller headed a dramatic winner for Rangers' nine men in the 84th minute.

Three days after their demoralising defeat, St Mirren defeated Celtic 4–0 in a Scottish Premier League fixture, with the surprise result going a long way to ensuring their survival in the division and derailing Celtic's challenge for the league title, which instead ultimately went to Rangers. In contrast, on the same night Rangers were eliminated from the Scottish Cup by eventual winners Dundee United, ending the Govan club's hopes of a treble.

Match details

Statistics

Source

Media coverage
The 2010 Scottish League Cup Final was broadcast live on BBC One Scotland on their Sportscene programme with build-up starting at 14:30 GMT. In Ireland it was broadcast live on Setanta Ireland.

Commentary of the match on radio was from BBC Radio Scotland, BBC Radio nan Gàidheal and BBC Radio 5 Live Sports Extra.

References

2010
Scottish League Cup Final 2010
Scottish League Cup Final 2010
League Cup Final
League Cup Final
2010s in Glasgow
March 2010 sports events in the United Kingdom